Lady & Bird is the eponymous debut studio album from a collaboration between the singer/songwriter Keren Ann and Barði Jóhannson, the lead singer of the Icelandic band Bang Gang.

Track listing
 "Do What I Do"
 "Shepard's Song"
 "Stephanie Says" (The Velvet Underground cover)
 "Walk Real Slow"
 "Suicide Is Painless" (theme from M*A*S*H)
 "The Morning After"
 "Run in the Morning Sun"
 "See Me Fall"
 "Blue Skies"
 " of Lady and Bird"
 "Do What I Do" (acoustic, live)

References

External links
Lady & Bird - Lady & Bird (2006) at www.billboard.com
Biography at www.billboard.com
Mark Deming: [ Lady & Bird Review] at Allmusic
 

Keren Ann albums
2006 albums